AL 7 and AL-7 can refer to:
The AL-7 assault rifle
Lyulka AL-7 turbojet
U.S. Route 11 in Alabama, internally signed Alabama State Route 7
Alabama's 7th congressional district